Eustace Hale Ball (1881 - 1931) was a writer, screenwriter, and director of short films in the United States. He wrote The Voice on the Wire, Bubbles from Gotham's Pierian Spring, Traffic In Souls: A Novel Of Crime And Its Cure, and The Gaucho.

An interview with him was published in a 1917 edition of The Editor.

Books
A Handbook for Scenario Writer's (1913)
The Art of the Photoplay (1913)
Traffic in Souls: A Novel of Crime and Its Cure (1914)
Photoplay Scenarios: How to Write and Sell Them (1915)
The Voice on the Wire (1915)
Mollie: A Novel (1926)
The Scarlet Fox Grosset and Dunlap, New York (1927)
The Gaucho, Grosset and Dunlap, New York (1928), a novelization of the screen play
The Legion of the Condemned, novelization (1928)

Filmography
Robin Hood (1912 film), scenario
Checkers (1913 film), scenario with Larence McGill
The Voice on the Wire (1917)
Beyond the Rainbow (1922), adaptation

References

External links
Findagrave entry

1881 births
1931 deaths
20th-century American screenwriters